Donald Macgregor may refer to:

 Donald Macgregor (athlete) (1939–2020), Scottish athlete at the 1972 summer Olympics
 Donald Robert Macgregor (1824–1889), Scottish politician, Member of Parliament for Leith Burghs 1874–1878
 Donald MacGregor (Liberal MP) (1839–1911), Liberal Member of Parliament for Inverness-shire 1892–1895

See also
 Donald Morris McGregor (1923–2003), Canadian politician
 Don McGregor (born 1945), American comic book writer